The 2017 Gamba Osaka season was Gamba Osaka's 24th season in the J1 League and 30th overall in the Japanese top flight. It saw them compete in the 18 team J1 League which had reverted to a single stage format of 34 games where each team played the other 17 participants home and away after an unsuccessful trial of a first stage and second stage being followed by a championship playoff series. City rivals, Cerezo Osaka were promoted from J2 at the end of 2016 meaning that the two sides played derby matches for the first time since 2014 and with neighbouring Vissel Kobe also participating in J1, Gamba had 4 league derbies to look forward to throughout the season.

Gamba also competed in the 2017 J.League Cup and Emperors Cup with the timing of their entry into both competitions being determined by their progress in the Champions League. As the 4th placed side in the 2016 J1 League, Gamba entered at the play off round where they faced Malaysia's Johor Darul Ta'zim in a one-off match at Suita City Football Stadium on 7 February. Goals from Ademilson, Shun Nagasawa and Genta Miura secured a comfortable 3-0 victory and saw Gamba progress to the group stages where they were drawn in Group H along with Australian's Adelaide United, Korean side Jeju United and Chinese outfit Jiangsu Suning.   Unfortunately for the second season running they were eliminated at the group stage after taking a mere 4 points from their 6-round robin games.

Gamba's results in other competitions were equally disappointing. A bright start in J1 saw them top the standing after round 12, however just 4 wins in their remaining matches led them to a 10th-place finish which saw long serving manager Kenta Hasegawa removed from his position at the end of the season.

Gamba ended the season trophy-less following a defeat to city rivals Cerezo in the semi-finals of the J.League Cup and a 3-2 home loss against Kashiwa Reysol in the 4th round of the Emperor's Cup.

Transfers

Prior to the commencement on the 2017 season, Gamba announced a raft of transfer dealings. Headlining the arrivals were, attacking midfielder, Jin Izumisawa, who had played a key role in Omiya Ardija's 5th-place finish in J1 the previous year where he linked well with ex-Gamba favourite Akihiro Ienaga as well as Brazilian centre-back Fabio who took the well trodden path to Osaka from Yokohama F. Marinos to provide competition for the established centre-half pairing of Daiki Niwa and Kim Jung-ya. In addition Ryota Suzuki, who had been on loan at J2 League side, Tokyo Verdy, from his parent club Yokohama F. Marinos in 2016 came in to compete with Yosuke Fujigawa and Ken Tajiri to be backup to first choice goalkeeper, Masaaki Higashiguchi. Young defender Genta Miura from newly promoted J1 side Shimizu S-Pulse and midfielder Haruya Ide from JEF United Chiba rounded off the signings who would immediately join up with the first team squad.

Young talent in the form of midfielders; Shogo Nakahara from Consadole Sapporo and Yuto Mori from Nagoya Grampus as well as striker Hiromu Kori from J3 outfit Grulla Morioka all arrived but would initially link up with Gamba Osaka U-23 ahead of their second season of J3 football while midfielders Reo Takae, Takahiro Koh and South Korean defender Bae Soo-yong all joined the club straight from high school and would join Nakahara, Mori and Kori in the under-23 side. Ryotaro Meshino, who played 13 times for Gamba Under-23 in 2016 was officially promoted to the senior squad for 2017 although he would begin the year once more with the under-23s.

There were several big name departures as Gamba head-coach Kenta Hasegawa went about reducing the average age of the squad ahead of the 2017 season. Probably the biggest surprise was right-sided midfielder Hiroyuki Abe's move to J1 rivals Kawasaki Frontale, having been a key member of the side since his arrival in 2012, scoring 7 times in 30 games during Gamba's J1 title winning season of 2014. Fellow attacking midfielder and Gamba youth product, Kotaro Omori, made the short trip west to join Vissel Kobe while experienced centre-half Keisuke Iwashita, who had been plagued with injuries and subsequently lost his place to Kim Jung-ya during the previous campaign joined Avispa Fukuoka who had been relegated from J1 at the end of 2016.

Striker Shingo Akamine who had spent the 2016 season on loan to J2 side Fagiano Okayama made his move there permanent while veteran midfielder Takahiro Futagawa who had been on loan at Tokyo Verdy for the second half of 2016 extended his loan for another 12 months. Joining him in Tokyo would be Tatsuya Uchida who also joined Verdy on a year's loan while another Gamba youth product, Takaharu Nishino joined JEF United on loan for the season in the hope of rebuilding a once promising career which had been hampered by injuries.

Rounding off the pre-season departures, it was no surprise to see midfielders Kenya Okazaki and Shohei Ogura head through the exit door, both were experienced pros who'd spent the bulk of the previous year playing J3 football with Gamba's Under-23 side and were moved on to make way for younger talent. Okazaki made the move to J2 outfit Tochigi SC while Ogura signed for J1's Ventforet Kofu. Finally, young attacking midfielder, Naoki Ogawa, a squad member since 2014 without managing a single league appearance wasn't named in the 2017 squad and his future in the game is still to be announced.

Kashima Antlers forward Shuhei Akasaki joined the squad on a season-long loan 3 weeks into the new campaign and was assigned the number 53 shirt. He debuted as a second-half substitute in the match against the Urawa Red Diamonds on March 19. On the final day of the winter transfer window, Brazilian striker Patric who had been undergoing rehabilitation on his injured knee in his homeland was re-registered ahead of an anticipated return to fitness in June, however, after an appearance for Gamba U-23 in late May, the club announced that his contracted would not be renewed when it expired on June 30.

In

Out

Coaching staff

First-team squad
Appearances and goals as of the beginning of the 2017 season.

* indicates player returned to Gamba Osaka from a loan spell with this club.

J1 League

The league returned to a single stage format for 2017 with 34 rounds played between March and November 2017.   On 12 January, Gamba's first 2 fixtures for the season were announced, at home to Ventforet Kofu and away to Kashiwa Reysol.   The dates for the remaining games were made public on January 25.

* = all times Japan Standard Time.

Match Day Line-Ups

The following players appeared for Gamba Osaka during the 2017 J1 League:

 = Substitute on,  = Substitute Off,  = Number of goals scored,  = Yellow Card and  = Red Card.

AFC Champions League

As the 4th placed side in the 2016 J1 League, Gamba entered the Champions League at the play off round where they faced Malaysia's Johor Darul Ta'zim in a one-off match at Suita City Football Stadium on 7 February.   Goals from Ademilson, Shun Nagasawa and Genta Miura secured a comfortable 3-0 victory and saw Gamba progress to the group stages where they were drawn in Group H along with Australian's Adelaide United, Korean side Jeju United and Chinese outfit Jiangsu Suning.

For the second season running, Gamba found themselves eliminated at the group stage.   After starting their campaign strongly with an impressive 3-0 victory away to Adelaide, they were brought back to earth with a thump in round 2, being humbled 4-1 at home by Jeju United.   Back to back defeats to Jiangsu Suning followed and left their hopes of progression hanging by a thread.   The round 5 home clash with Adelaide offered them a lifeline and things seemed to be going smoothly when Nagasawa and Doan put them 2-0 ahead after only 12 minutes.   However an error by Kim Jung-ya allowed the Australian side to grab a goal before half time, while the second half saw Yasuhito Endō miss a penalty and Adelaide grab an injury time equaliser to all but eliminate the 2008 Champions league winners.   A meek 2-0 defeat to Jeju in Korea where only a large victory would have seen them qualify for the knock out stages sounded the death knell of Gamba's campaign which had started so brightly but ultimately died a slow and painful death.

Results

* = all times in local country's time.

Match Day Line-Ups

The following players appeared for Gamba Osaka during the 2017 AFC Champions League:

 = Substitute on,  = Substitute Off,  = Number of goals scored,  = Yellow Card and  = Red Card.

Emperor's Cup

Following their group stage exit from the AFC Champions League, Gamba entered the 2017 Emperor's Cup at the second round stage where they were handed a home tie against Kyushu-based side Verspah Oita.   A comfortable 3-0 win secured a place in the third round and match up against J2 League's JEF United Chiba.   Goals from Fabio and Izumisawa saw Gamba ease past JEF United and set up a clash against another Chiba-based side, Kashiwa Reysol in round 4.   After following 3-0 behind early in the second half, Gamba rallied valiantly, however goals from Nagasawa and Ideguchi were unable to prevent them from exiting the competition before the quarter-finals for the first time since 2013.

* = all times Japan Standard Time.

Match Day Line-Ups

The following players appeared for Gamba Osaka during the 2017 Emperor's Cup:

 = Substitute on,  = Substitute Off,  = Number of goals scored,  = Yellow Card and  = Red Card.

J.League Cup

As a result of their qualification for the AFC Champions League, Gamba were given a bye to the quarter finals of the 2017 J.League Cup where they were paired with Kansai rivals, Vissel Kobe.   Despite being without international players; Higashiguchi, Miura and Ideguchi, Gamba were able to prevail 2-0 on aggregate over their neighbours.   A goalless first-leg in Kobe was followed by a 2-0 home win with the decisive goals coming from Nagasawa and Izumisawa.   This set up another derby match in the semi-finals, this time against city rivals, Cerezo.   Following a 2-2 draw away in the first leg, Gamba appeared to be heading towards the final with the scores tied at one apiece going into extra time in the return leg, however Yasuki Kimoto's 95th-minute winner ended Gamba's hopes of silverware in 2017.

Match Day Line-Ups

The following players appeared for Gamba Osaka during the 2017 J.League Cup:

 = Substitute on,  = Substitute Off,  = Number of goals scored,  = Yellow Card and  = Red Card.

Squad statistics

Statistics accurate as of match played on 2 December 2017.

Goalscorers

Assists

References

Gamba Osaka
Gamba Osaka seasons